The Motorcycle Diaries is a 2004 biopic about the journey and written memoir of the 23-year-old Ernesto Guevara, who would several years later become internationally known as the Marxist guerrilla leader and revolutionary leader Che Guevara. The film recounts the 1952 expedition, initially by motorcycle, across South America by Guevara and his friend Alberto Granado. As well as being a road movie, the film is a coming-of-age film; as the adventure, initially centered on youthful hedonism, unfolds, Guevara discovers himself transformed by his observations on the life of the impoverished indigenous peasantry. Through the characters they encounter on their continental trek, Guevara and Granado witness first hand the injustices that the destitute face and are exposed to people and social classes they would have never encountered otherwise. To their surprise, the road presents to them both a genuine and captivating picture of Latin American identity. As a result, the trip also plants the initial seed of radicalization within Guevara, who would later challenge the continent's endemic economic inequalities and political repression.

The screenplay is based primarily on Guevara's trip diary of the same name, with additional context supplied by Traveling with Che Guevara: The Making of a Revolutionary by Alberto Granado. Guevara is played by Gael García Bernal (who previously played Che in the 2002 miniseries Fidel), and Granado by the Argentine actor Rodrigo de la Serna, who incidentally is a second cousin to the real-life Guevara on his maternal side. Directed by Brazilian director Walter Salles and written by Puerto Rican playwright José Rivera, the film was an international co-production among production companies from Argentina, the United States, Germany, the United Kingdom, Chile, Peru and France. The film's executive producers were Robert Redford, Paul Webster, and Rebecca Yeldham; the producers were Edgard Tenenbaum, Michael Nozik, and Karen Tenkhoff; and the co-producers were Daniel Burman and Diego Dubcovsky.

Plot

In 1952, a semester before Ernesto "Fuser" Guevara is due to complete his medical degree, he and his older friend Alberto Granado, a biochemist, leave Buenos Aires to travel across South America. While there is a goal at the end of their journey - they intend to work in a leper colony in Peru - the main purpose is initially fun and adventure. Their initial method of transport is Granado's dilapidated Norton 500 motorcycle christened La Poderosa ("The Mighty One").

Their planned route is ambitious, bringing them north across the Andes, along the coast of Chile, through the Atacama Desert and into the Peruvian Amazon in order to reach Venezuela just in time for Granado's 30th birthday on 2 April. However, due to La Poderosa's breakdown, they are forced to travel at a much slower pace, often walking, and do not make it to Caracas until July.

During their expedition, Guevara and Granado encounter the poverty of the indigenous peasants, and the movie assumes a greater seriousness once the men gain a better sense of the disparity between the "haves" (to which they belong) and the obviously exploited "have-nots" (who make up the majority of those they encounter) by travelling on foot. In Chile, for instance, they encounter a penniless and persecuted couple forced onto the road because of their communist beliefs. In a fire-lit scene, Guevara and Granado ashamedly admit to the couple that they are not out looking for work as well. The duo then accompanies the couple to the Chuquicamata copper mine, where Guevara becomes angry at the treatment of the workers.

However, it is a visit to the ancient Incan ruins of Machu Picchu in Peru that solidifies something in Guevara. His musings are then somberly refocused to how an indigenous civilization capable of building such beauty could be destroyed by the creators of the eventually polluted urban decay of nearby Lima.

Later, in Peru, they volunteer for three weeks at the San Pablo leper colony. There, Guevara observes both literally and metaphorically the division of society, as the staff live on the north side of a river, separated from the deprived lepers living across the river to the south. To demonstrate his solidarity, and his medical belief that leprosy is not contagious, Guevara refuses to wear rubber gloves during his visit as the head nun requires, choosing instead to shake bare hands and interact normally with the surprised leper patients.

At the end of the film, after his sojourn at the leper colony, Guevara confirms his nascent egalitarian, revolutionary impulses, while making a birthday toast, which is also his first political speech. In it, he invokes a pan-Latin American identity that transcends the arbitrary boundaries of both nation and race. These encounters with social injustice transform the way Guevara sees the world and his purposes in it, and by implication motivates his later political activities as a Marxist revolutionary.

Guevara makes his symbolic "final journey" at night when, despite the danger and his asthma, he swims across the river that separates the two societies of the leper colony, to spend the night in a leper shack, instead of in the doctors' cabins. Later, as they bid each other farewell at an airport, Granado reveals that his birthday was not 2 April, but rather 8 August, and that the aforementioned goal was simply a motivator: Guevara replies that he knew all along. The film closes with an appearance by the real 82-year-old Alberto Granado, along with pictures from the actual journey and a brief mention of Che Guevara's eventual 1967 CIA-assisted execution in the Bolivian jungle.

Cast

Development

Gael García Bernal agreed to reprise his role as young Che Guevara having previously portrayed him in the television film Fidel (2002 film). To prepare for the role, he went through six months of intense preparation. This groundwork included reading "every biography" about Guevara, traveling to Cuba to speak with Guevara's family, and consulting with Guevara's then still living travel partner Alberto Granado. Despite being in his eighties, Granado was also taken on as an adviser by Salles, and enthusiastically followed the film crew as they retraced his former journey.

Moreover, García Bernal (who is Mexican) adopted an Argentine accent and spent 14 weeks reading the works of José Martí, 
Karl Marx and Pablo Neruda (Guevara's favorite poet). García Bernal told reporters "I feel a lot of responsibility. I want to do it well because of what Che represents to the world. He is a Romantic. He had a political consciousness that changed Latin America." According to García Bernal, the role crystallized his "own sense of duty" because Guevara "decided to live on the side of the mistreated, to live on the side of the people who have no justice - and no voice." In surmising the similarities between his transformation and Guevara's, García Bernal posits that "my generation is awakening, and we're discovering a world full of incredible injustice."

Granado later stated that he appreciated the film's effort "to dig beneath the "mythical Che", whose defiant image appears on T-shirts and posters around the world, "to reveal the flawed, flesh-and-blood Ernesto beneath."

Film locales

In a journey that lasts eight months, the partners travel over 14,000 kilometers (8,700 miles), from Argentina through Chile, Peru, and Colombia to Venezuela. Key locations along the journey described in the film include: in Argentina: Buenos Aires, Miramar, Villa Gesell, San Martín de los Andes, Lago Frías, Patagonia and Nahuel Huapi Lake; in Chile: Temuco, Los Angeles, Valparaiso, the Atacama desert, and Chuquicamata; in Peru: Cuzco, Machu Picchu, Lima, The San Pablo Leper Colony; as well as Leticia, Colombia and Caracas, Venezuela.

Reviewer Nick Cowen of The Daily Telegraph described the scenery as "visually stunning" while remarking that "the cinematography of fog-cloaked mountains, lush, green forests and sunburnt deserts is breathtakingly beautiful enough to serve as a travel advert for the entire continent."

Tourist trails

The Observer reported that shortly after the film's release, tour operators in the region received a surge of inquiries, with some of them even offering Che Guevara-themed trips, where travellers could "follow in the footsteps of the revolutionary icon."

The crew filmed in the same San Pablo Leper Colony that Guevara himself had visited. According to Bernal, 85% of the people suffering leprosy in the film were actual lepers, with some of them having lived there when Che and Granado worked at the colony. In fact, when Granado returned with the film crew to the leprosarium of San Pablo, he found some of the people he had treated half a century earlier, remarking that "It was wonderful and amazing that they could still remember me." Granado was also pleased that buildings constructed for the scenes shot at the leprosarium were afterwards used by the patients themselves.

The scene which features Guevara's character swimming across to the other side of the river was filmed during three nights in which Bernal swam across the actual Amazon River.

Soundtrack

The score for The Motorcycle Diaries was composed by Gustavo Santaolalla. The film's soundtrack was released on the Deutsche Grammophon label in 2004.

Distribution
The film was first presented at the Sundance Film Festival on 15 January 2004. Granado had an invitation to the Sundance premiere, but he was refused an entry Visa by the United States. Later it was featured at the 2004 Cannes Film Festival on 19 May, and Granado was able to attend.

The film later screened at many other film festivals, including: the Auckland International Film Festival, New Zealand; the Copenhagen International Film Festival, Denmark; the Espoo Film Festival, Finland; the Telluride Film Festival, United States; the Toronto International Film Festival, Canada; the Vancouver International Film Festival, Canada; the Celebrating Literature in Cinema Film Festival Frankfurt, Germany; and the Morelia Film Festival, Mexico.

Release dates
 United States: 15 January 2004 (premiere at Sundance Film Festival)
 France: 7 July 2004
 Argentina: 29 July 2004
 United Kingdom: 27 August 2004
 United States: 24 September 2004
 Chile:  21 October 2004
 Germany: 28 October 2004

Critical reception

The Motorcycle Diaries was released to very positive reviews by critics, and received a standing ovation at the 2004 Sundance Film Festival. The New York Times film critic, A.O. Scott, wrote that "in Mr. Salles's hands what might have been a schematic story of political awakening becomes a lyrical exploration of the sensations and perceptions from which a political understanding of the world emerges." Gregory Weinkauf of the Dallas Observer espoused that the film "delivers as both biography and road movie, and proves itself a deceptively humble epic, an illuminating part of the Che legacy." Claudia Puig of USA Today postulated that "the movie achieves an impressive blend of emotional resonance and light entertainment" while describing it as "more coming-of-age story than biopic" and "a transformative adventure well worth watching." Keri Petersen of The Gainesville Sun referred to the film as "a gorgeous, poetic adventure."

Paula Nechak of the Seattle Post-Intelligencer praised director Salles by remarking that he "presents the evolutionary course of a young man who coincidentally became the dorm-room poster boy for an idealistic generation, and captures the lovely, heart-and-eye-opening ode to youthful possibility with affection and compassion." Washington Post critic Desson Thomson lent praise for the film's starring actor by observing that "what Bernal and this well-wrought movie conveys so well is the charisma that would soon become a part of human history, and yes, T-shirts."

Among the film's few detractors was Roger Ebert of the Chicago Sun-Times, who described the film's positive reviews as "a matter of political correctness, I think; it is uncool to be against Che Guevara." Ebert also criticized the film's characterization: "seen simply as a film, The Motorcycle Diaries is attenuated and tedious. We understand that Ernesto and Alberto are friends, but that's about all we find out about them; they develop none of the complexities of other on-the-road couples... Nothing is startling or poetic." Jessica Winter of The Village Voice also criticized the film's simplistic representation of the peasantry, describing "the young men's encounters with conscience-pricking, generically noble locals" who are occasionally assembled "to face the camera in a still life of heroic, art-directed suffering". The film also received criticism for its positive representation of Guevara as a youthful idealist. Anthony Daniels, an outspoken critic of Guevara's, argued that the film helps to continue his wrongful glorification, noting "The film is thus the cinematic equivalent of the Che Guevara T-shirt; it is morally monstrous and emotionally trivial." Frans Weiser agreed, saying that the film's narrative is dominated by reductive images of Guevara as an idealistic, loveable rogue.

Online review aggregator Metacritic gives the film a score of 75 out of 100 based on 37 reviews, indicating "generally favorable reviews". Meanwhile, Rotten Tomatoes records an 83% approval rating based on 157 reviews, with an average rating of 7.5/10. The website's critical consensus reads, "The Motorcycle Diaries is heartfelt and profound in its rendering of the formative experiences that turn Ernesto "Che" Guevara into a famous revolutionary." Furthermore, British historian Alex von Tunzelmann, who reviews films at The Guardian for historical accuracy, graded the film an A− in "History", while giving the film a B in "Entertainment". After comparing scenes from the film to the actual diaries, Tunzelmann posited that "The Motorcycle Diaries gets a lot right, it's an entertaining and accurate portrayal of the formative youth of a revolutionary icon."

Awards won
 Cannes Film Festival: François Chalais Award, Walter Salles; Prize of the Ecumenical Jury, Walter Salles; Technical Grand Prize, Eric Gautier; 2004.
 Donostia-San Sebastián International Film Festival: Audience Award Walter Salles; 2004.
 Academy Awards: Oscar; Best Achievement in Music Written for Motion Pictures, Original Song; Jorge Drexler; for the song "Al otro lado del río"; 2005.
 Argentine Film Critics Association Awards: Best Actor, Rodrigo de la Serna; Best Music, Gustavo Santaolalla; Best Adapted Screenplay, Jose Rivera; 2005.
 British Academy of Film and Television Arts: Best Film Not in the English Language, Michael Nozik, Edgard Tenenbaum, Karen Tenkhoff, Walter Salles; Anthony Asquith Award for Film Music, Gustavo Santaolalla; 2005.
 Goya Awards: Goya; Best Adapted Screenplay, José Rivera; 2005.
 Independent Spirit Awards: Independent Spirit Award; Best Cinematography, Eric Gautier; Best Debut Performance, Rodrigo de la Serna; 2005.

Related films

References

External links

 
 
 
 
 Che's Route Revisited on Authentic Period Norton Motorcycles
 NPR Audio Report: Film Looks at Twenty-something Che Guevara by David Edelstein

 Press
 "On the Trail of the Young Che Guevara". The New York Times, 19 December 2004
 "Take Inspiration From Che and Discover South America". Easier Travel, 3 June 2009
 "The Motorcycle Diaries: How Ernesto turned into Che Guevara". Stephen Philip, Socialist Worker, August 2004
 "Motorcycle Diaries: Che Guevara and the Romance of Revolution". Megan Cornish, Freedom Socialist, December 2004

2004 films
2004 biographical drama films
2000s drama road movies
American coming-of-age drama films
American biographical drama films
Chilean drama films
Peruvian drama road movies
Peruvian biographical drama films
British drama road movies
German drama road movies
French drama road movies
2000s Spanish-language films
Quechua-language films
Films directed by Walter Salles
BAFTA winners (films)
Best Foreign Language Film BAFTA Award winners
Films that won the Best Original Song Academy Award
Films about Che Guevara
Films based on biographies
Films set in Argentina
Films set in Chile
Films set in 1952
Films set in Venezuela
Films shot in Argentina
Films shot in Buenos Aires
Films set in Peru
Films shot in Chile
Films shot in Peru
Films shot in Venezuela
American independent films
2004 independent films
Film4 Productions films
Films produced by Michael Nozik
Films based on diaries
Films scored by Gustavo Santaolalla
2004 drama films
Argentine coming-of-age films
Argentine drama films
Chilean coming-of-age films
2000s American films
2000s British films
2000s Peruvian films
2000s French films
2000s German films
2000s Argentine films